Malekshan or Malakshan may refer to:
 Malekshan-e Olya
 Malekshan-e Sofla